The 1968–69 Austrian Hockey League season was the 39th season of the Austrian Hockey League, the top level of ice hockey in Austria. Seven teams participated in the league, and EC KAC won the championship.

First round

Final round

Results carried over from the first round.

Qualification round

Results carried over from the first round.

Relegation
EK Zell am See - HC Salzburg (10:1, 3:4)

External links
Austrian Ice Hockey Association

Austrian Hockey League seasons
Aus
Aust